The European Half Marathon Cup is a quadrennial team marathon competition between European countries held for the first time in 2016, incorporated in the half marathon events of the European Athletics Championships. The event alternates biennially with the European Marathon Cup which is held under similar rules when the European Athletics Championships are held in non-Olympic years.

Editions

Medals
In italic the participants whose result did not go into the team's total time, but awarded with medals.

Men

Women

All-time medal table

See also
 European Marathon Cup
 European Athletics Championships

References

External links
 EAA web site

European Athletic Association competitions
Recurring sporting events established in 2016
Half marathons